I'm Still Alive is a 1940 American drama film directed by Irving Reis and written by Edmund H. North. The film stars Kent Taylor, Linda Hayes, Howard Da Silva, Ralph Morgan and Don Dillaway. The film was released on September 20, 1940, by RKO Pictures.

Plot

A spat on a Hollywood set between stuntman Steve Bennett and actress Laura Marley leads to the two of them falling in love and being married. Steve's work is dangerous and Laura persuades him to quit, but he has difficulty finding a different occupation.

When youthful former colleague Tommy Briggs has a complicated stunt to do, Steve volunteers to take his place, then after being rejected by producer Walter Blake is devastated when Tommy is killed. Steve leaves to become a barnstorming pilot. Blake schemes to lure Steve back for Laura's sake by inventing a romance between her and stuntman Red Garvey. When he returns, Steve ends up involved in yet another life-threatening stunt. He barely survives, but Laura is happy to have him back.

Cast 
Kent Taylor as Steve Bennett
Linda Hayes as Laura Marley
Howard Da Silva as Red Garvey 
Ralph Morgan as Producer Walter Blake
Don Dillaway as Tommy Briggs
Clay Clement as Roger
Fred Niblo as Fred
Skippy as Skippy

References

External links 
 

1940 films
1940 romantic drama films
American romantic drama films
American black-and-white films
1940s English-language films
Films scored by Roy Webb
Films about stunt performers
Films directed by Irving Reis
RKO Pictures films
1940s American films